Angus Holden, 1st Baron Holden (16 March 1833 – 25 March 1912), was a British Liberal Party politician who was active in local government and sat in the House of Commons in two periods between 1885 and 1900. He was raised to the peerage as Baron Holden in 1908.

Holden was the eldest son of Sir Isaac Holden, 1st Bt, M.P., of Oakworth House in Oakworth, near Keighley, and his wife Marion Love, daughter of Angus Love of Paisley, Scotland. He was educated at Edinburgh and at Wesley College, Sheffield. He was a partner in the firm of Isaac Holden & Sons, Wool Combers, of Alston
Works, Bradford.

Holden was mayor of Bradford in 1878, 1879, 1880 and 1886. In 1884 he stood unsuccessfully for parliament at a by-election at Knaresborough.  At the 1885 general election, he was elected as the first MP for the Eastern Division of Bradford as a Liberal, but he lost the seat in the 1886 general election. He was mayor of Bradford again in 1886. At the 1892 general election he was returned as a Gladstonian Liberal for the Buckrose Division of the East Riding which he continued to represent until he retired from the House of Commons at the 1900 general election.

On the death of his father in 1897 he succeeded to the baronetcy, becoming Sir Angus Holden, 2nd Baronet. On 4 July 1908 he was raised to the peerage as Baron Holden, of Alston in the county of Cumberland.

After his death, he was succeeded in his titles by his son the Hon Ernest Illingworth Holden (born in 1867), who became the 3rd Baronet and the 2nd Baron Holden.

References

Obituary in The Times, Tuesday, 26 March 1912; p. 11; Issue 39856; col B

External links 
 

1833 births
1912 deaths
Liberal Party (UK) MPs for English constituencies
Barons in the Peerage of the United Kingdom
UK MPs 1885–1886
UK MPs 1892–1895
UK MPs 1895–1900
UK MPs who were granted peerages
Peers created by Edward VII
Mayors of Bradford
People educated at Wesley College, Sheffield